Las Hermanas is a one-act ballet created by Kenneth MacMillan in 1963 for the Stuttgart Ballet. The music is  Frank Martin's Harpsichord Concerto (1952). The piece is loosely based on The House of Bernarda Alba by Federico García Lorca.

The first performance was in 1963 at the Staatstheater Stuttgart performed by the Stuttgart Ballet. The principal characters were danced by Marcia Haydee, Ray Barra and Birgit Keil.

Original cast
Württembergisches Staatstheater Stuttgart, 13 July 1963:
 Marcia Haydée
 Birgit Keil
 Ray Barra
 Ruth Papendick

Notes

External links
 "Las Hermanas (1971)", Royal Opera House Collections Online, retrieved 8 October 2014

Ballets by Kenneth MacMillan
1963 ballet premieres